No to capitulation! was a series of protests in Ukraine against the policy of the President of Ukraine Volodymyr Zelenskyy in eastern Ukraine. Protestors considered implementation of the Minsk Agreements through the "" to be capitulation to Russia in the Russo-Ukrainian War.

Origins

Steinmeier Formula
The  is named after former German foreign minister Frank-Walter Steinmeier. In 2016, Steinmeier proposed that elections be held in the separatist-held territories of the Donetsk and Luhansk regions, which are de facto controlled by Russian-backed separatists and governed as the Donetsk People's Republic (DPR) and Luhansk People's Republic (LPR). Steinmeier wanted these elections to be held according to Ukrainian law, under the supervision of the OSCE. If the OSCE were to judge the balloting to be free and fair and the result were in favor of remaining within Ukraine, then Ukraine would be returned control of the regions under a special self-governing status.

Ukrainian agreement with Steinmeier Formula

On 1 October 2019, Russian media announced that the Ukrainian delegation had signed the Steinmeier Formula at the regular meeting of the Trilateral Contact Group on Ukraine.  A few hours later, the Presidential Office announced an urgent briefing. At the briefing, Ukrainian President Volodymyr Zelenskyy stated that Ukraine had agreed to the plan.

Separatist militants in the occupied Donbas consequently stated that Ukraine signing these agreements was "a victory for the DPR and the LPR over Ukraine". Russia supported the signing of the formula, claiming it was "a positive step in resolving the situation in Donbas."

See also
 2014 Ukrainian revolution

References

External links

October 2019 events in Ukraine
November 2019 events in Ukraine
December 2019 events in Ukraine
Protests in Ukraine
2019 in Ukraine
2019 protests
War in Donbas